This is a list of  lists of mosques in Asia.

See also

Lists of mosques

References

!Asia
Mosques